Scott Benton White (June 8, 1970 – October 21, 2011) was an American politician who served as a Democratic member of the Washington State Senate representing the 46th legislative district. His district included much of North Seattle, including the neighborhoods of Northgate, Greenwood, Bitter Lake, Broadview, Haller Lake, Pinehurst, Olympic Hills, Maple Leaf, Lake City, Wedgwood, View Ridge, Laurelhurst, and Windermere.

On October 21, 2011, White was found dead in a hotel room at Suncadia Resort. The coroner's report indicated that the cause was a cardiac problem linked to a previously undiagnosed enlarged heart.

During his 2011–2012 term, White's assignments in the Senate would have included serving in leadership as Majority Whip, as Vice Chair of the Transportation Committee, and serving on the Higher Education and Rules Committees.

White served in a variety of professional and community leadership positions before being elected to the legislature. He was a former Chief of Staff to the Metropolitan King County Council, and served as budget and policy staff in both the Washington State Legislature and King County governments. He taught graduate-level courses in public policy at the Daniel J. Evans School of Public Affairs at the University of Washington. In 2004 he was selected as a Marshall Fellow by the German Marshall Fund of the United States. White served on the board of Humanities Washington, the Public Policy Committee of the United Way of King County, and as a grassroots organizer for the Democratic Party.

A fourth-generation Washingtonian, White lived in the Wedgwood neighborhood of North Seattle with his wife, Alison Carl White, and their two young children.

References

1970 births
2011 deaths
Democratic Party members of the Washington House of Representatives
University of Washington alumni
Democratic Party Washington (state) state senators
Western Washington University alumni